Joaquim Washington Luiz de Oliveira (born December 24, 1949) is a Brazilian politician. He was federal deputy (2003–2004, 2007, 2009–2010). Oliveira is an advisor to the State Court of Audit.

Political career 
In 1994, he ran for federal deputy for the Workers' Party (PT), unsuccessfully.

In 2002, he ran for federal deputy, obtaining his substitution. Endorsed Raimundo Monteiro.

In 2006, he ran for federal deputy, obtaining his substitution. Endorsed Roseana Sarney

In 2010, he ran for vice-governor of Maranhão on board of Roseana Sarney, being elected.

In 2012, he ran for mayor of São Luís, occupying the fourth place.

In 2013, he resigned as vice-governor, being appointed advisor.

References 

Communist Party of Brazil politicians
Workers' Party (Brazil) politicians
1949 births
Living people